Jan Lake Airport  is located near Jan Lake, Saskatchewan, Canada.

See also 
List of airports in Saskatchewan

References 

Registered aerodromes in Saskatchewan